This is a list of singles that have peaked in the Top 10 of the Billboard Hot 100 during 1984.

Lionel Richie scored five top ten hits during the year with "All Night Long (All Night)", "Running with the Night", "Hello", "Stuck on You", and "Penny Lover", the most among all other artists.

Top-ten singles

1983 peaks

1985 peaks

See also
 1984 in music
 List of Hot 100 number-one singles of 1984 (U.S.)
 Billboard Year-End Hot 100 singles of 1984

References

General sources

Joel Whitburn Presents the Billboard Hot 100 Charts: The Eighties
Additional information obtained can be verified within Billboard's online archive services and print editions of the magazine.

1984
United States Hot 100 Top 10